Dmitrovskaya is the railway station of the Rizhsky suburban railway line located at the Northern Administrative Okrug, Moscow, Russia. The station is served by Line D2 of the Moscow Central Diameters which was opened on November 21, 2019.

References

Railway stations in Moscow
Railway stations of Moscow Railway
Line D2 (Moscow Central Diameters) stations